Amede or variation, may refer to:

People
 Amédé Ardoin (1898–1942), U.S. Louisiana Creole musician
 Amede Breaux (1900–1975), U.S. Cajun musician
 Amédé Froger (died 1956), Mayor of Boufarik assassinated during the Battle of Algiers (1956–1957)
 Amédé Gayot (19th century), President of the Senate (Haiti)
 Amede Nzeribe, child of Flora Nwapa (1931–1993)
 L. Amede Obiora, Nigerian lawyer, professor, author

 George Joseph Amede Coulon (1854–1922), artist and son of George David Coulon

 Menen Liben Amede (died 1858), Empress consort to Yohannes III of Ethiopia

Fictional characters
 Amede, a character from the 1966 novel Efuru
 Amédé Chabert, a character from the film Colonel Chabert (1994 film)

Places
 Amede, Mgbakwu, Awka North, Anambra, Nigeria; see List of villages in Anambra State
 Amede, Eha-Amufu, Isi-Uzo, Enugu, Nigeria; see List of villages in Enugu State
 Amede, former name of Domat/Ems, Imboden, Graubünden, Switzerland

Other uses
 Amédé (poem), a 2010 poem by Georgette LeBlanc (poet)

See also

 Amédès, a character from the 1789 opera Nephté
 Amedes Holding GmbH, a subsidiary of OMERS
 
 
 Amade (name)
 Amadea (disambiguation)
 Amadee (disambiguation)
 Amadeus (disambiguation)
 Amedee (disambiguation)
 Amedeo (disambiguation)
 Ahmad (disambiguation)